Chen Ying may refer to:

Chen Ying (badminton) (born 1971), Chinese badminton player
Chen Ying (sport shooter) (born 1977), Chinese sport shooter
Jeannie Chan (born 1989), or Chen Ying, Hong Kong based actress
Chen Ying (fictional), fictional character in the historical novel Romance of the Three Kingdoms

See also
Ying Chen (born 1961), Chinese Canadian author